Crossing Knob is a mountain in the North Carolina High Country, west from the community of Sugar Grove.  The mountain is within the Pisgah National Forest and its elevation reaches .  The mountain is flanked by the Watauga River on three sides and US 321 along its south.

References

Mountains of North Carolina
Mountains of Watauga County, North Carolina